is a very large rhizostome jellyfish, in the same size class as the lion's mane jellyfish, the largest cnidarian in the world. It is edible but not considered high quality. It is the only species in the monotypic genus Nemopilema.

Overview

The diameter when fully grown is slightly greater than the height of an average human. The species was named in tribute to Mr. Kan'ichi Nomura (C18–C19), Director General of the Fukui Prefectural Fisheries Experimental Station, who in early December 1921 sent a specimen in a  wooden tank to Professor Kishinouye, who found that it was unknown and spent some time at the station to study living specimens.

Population blooms appear to be increasing with frequency in the past 20 years. Possible reasons for the population increase in Nomura's Jellyfish include climate change, overfishing, and coastal modification adding substrate for asexually producing polyps.

The organism Nemopilema nomurai is one of the largest of all jellyfish species, attaining a bell diameter of ca. 2 m and a wet weight of ca. 200 kg (Kawahara, 2006). Nemopilema nomurai caught around Tsushima and the Iki Islands had a translucent whitish body, with pinkish or reddish capulets and oral arms, and transparent immature gonads.
Jellyfish have two main types of muscle: epitheliomuscular cells and striated muscle cells. Researchers found that gene families that are closely associated with striated muscle were expressed in the bell portion of the jellyfish, providing evidence that striated muscle plays a significant role in jellyfish motility.

In 2009, a  fishing trawler, the Diasan Shinsho-maru, capsized off Chiba on Tokyo Bay as its three-man crew tried to haul in a net containing dozens of Nomura's jellyfish; the three were rescued by another trawler.

Life cycle
The life cycle of Nemopilema nomurai is very similar to that of other rhizostomes. Nomura’s jellyfish are normally found in the Yellow Sea and populations are generally maintained there year round. During June and July changes in the water salinity lead to the expatriation of larval stage jellyfish via the Tsushima strait. In 2005 the largest blooms were in late October.

Ecology
While jellyfish blooms have been documented in the Sea of Japan since the writing of their first history book, the blooms of Nemopilema nomurai have been more recent. Since the beginning of the 20th century the instances of N. nomurai explosive blooms have been on the increase, a fact not helped by their size — being one of the largest species of jellyfish recorded. This species of jellyfish feeds mostly on zooplankton in all stages of life, feeding on larger fish as they grow larger. Their only predators consist of swordfish, tuna, sunfish, leatherback turtles and humans.

Envenomations
Severe envenomations are becoming more common than ever. Victims of a sting from the N. Nomurai jellyfish may present symptoms of itching, swelling, acute pain, local erythrosis, and inflammation; in severe cases, the envenomations can cause death. The nematocyst venom of the N. nomurai is composed of complex, toxic mixtures of proteins. Further research is in progress to determine the key factors within these protein mixtures, which could predict specific symptoms from the venom and aid in treatment. Using experimental omics-based approaches, research has revealed different sting related proteins and enzymatic components such as metalloproteinase and phospholipase A2s, as well as differences in hemolytic activity. However, research has yet to provide a correlation between these components and symptoms of the envenomation.

Uses
Since the recent increase in blooms, research has been underway to find uses for the Nomura’s jellyfish. Each year this species costs Japanese fisheries serious damage and so an economic solution may be found in converting this invasion into a resource.

As food

The Japanese company Tango Jersey Dairy produces a vanilla and jellyfish ice cream using Nomura's jellyfish. Consuming echizen kurage is potentially dangerous if the toxic part is not thoroughly cleaned and cooked.

Medical
One study sought to use the mucin of the Nomura’s jellyfish to treat joint disease such as osteoarthritis.

Agriculture
Like many invasive species, such as the cane toad, a simple solution is to take the species and convert them into fertilizer. Another study aimed at using an aqueous methanol extract of dried medusa to inhibit the growth of weed seedlings when added to soil.

References

External links 

Giant Echizen jellyfish off Japan coast, (BBC News, November 30, 2009)
Giant Jellyfish Invade Japan (National Geographic)
Super blobs' deep impact (The Sydney Morning Herald)
Chefs prepare for annual giant jellyfish invasion (Pink Tentacle)
Japanese fishermen brace for giant jellyfish (CNN)
The Age Of Jellyfish (spectre footnotes (blog), July 31, 2009)
Giant Jellyfish Head North in Warming World, MSNBC

Invertebrates of China
Invertebrates of Japan
Invertebrates of Korea

Cnidarians of the Pacific Ocean
Rhizostomatidae
Animals described in 1922
Potentially dangerous food